Rick Jay Glen (born October 13, 1981) is an American actor, singer/songwriter, director, producer, and screenwriter. He is best known for the voice of Briar, from the internationally recognized animated television series Boonie Bears, as well as the animated films Boonie Bears: To the Rescue (2014) and Boonie Bears: Mystical Winter (2015). He has also voiced the character "Sarge" in Reboant: Endless Dawn (2018), and the voices of Apollo, Hades, Jones, Minotaur, and Poseidon for Genesis MOBA (2019), available on PS4 and Steam.'''

Early life
Growing up in the Bay Area of California, he began singing and writing stories from the time he was in grade school.

By the time he reached junior high, his family moved to Concord, California. He later attended Concord High School. After he graduated from high school in 2000, he continued performing with his band, Umbra. The band unfortunately disbanded in 2006, when, lead guitarist, David Tracey's father committed suicide in their Antioch, California, home on July 22, 2004. Rick moved to Maui with the family in September.

After returning to California in 2005, Rick attended college in Chico to further pursue his interest in psychology. However, his passion for creative arts led him to be more involved in theater, radio, commercial and video game VoiceOver work, and independent films. He returned to Concord in 2009 before moving to Shenzhen, China, to continue his acting career.

Cancer
At the age of four months, he was diagnosed with rhabdomyosarcoma, a cancer of the connective tissue. He was treated at Children's Hospital Oakland, where they surgically removed the tumor. He underwent chemotherapy for the following two years. The cancer has not returned. In his youth he also attended Camp Okizu as a child, a camp for childhood cancer survivors, and volunteered with The American Cancer Society events to raise funding for cancer research and treatments.

Career
Rick began his career as an actor, studying theater at Butte College and Chico State in 2005. After several years of acting on stage, he began a short-lived career as a stand-up comic. He focused on writing and stand-up until his first full-length Indie film role as Bodhi Hemingway in "Telling Lies", which unfortunately never finished post-production. He continued with theater and working with the Chico Blue Room Theater's Youth Production Company. In 2010, he finally found himself working with Fantawild Animation International Studios in Shenzhen, China, voicing characters for their animated series "Chicken Stew" and "Kung Fu Masters of the Zodiac: 12 Zodiac Way".

In 2011, the company released the animated hit series "Boonie Bears" for which Rick voiced the famously sincere and responsible older brother bear, Briar. The series picked up momentum, as "Boonie Bears or Bust" (the second season to the franchise) was released and brought more loveable characters voiced by Rick, including Babu (the spastic monkey minion of King Tiki), HooHoo (the ditsy, clueless but cheerful owl), Fabian (the cunningly diabolical pet of the notorious Logger Vick), and Shaolin (the wise acrobatic tiger of the local circus troupe). As the franchise began to gain international recognition, multiple series followed.

In 2013, the company began production on "One and a Half Heroes" (also titled "Tornadoclaw). The story about a great ancient warrior, Tornadoclaw (Rick Jay Glen), a master warrior cat whose reputation had been tarnished, and was exiled from the kingdom. Although the series received great reviews from the pilot episode, the production was scratched after the first episode.

Rick continued to work with the writing staff, music department, and marketing team of Fantawild Animation on two full-length made for tv animated movies "Boonie Bears: Homeward Journey" and "Boonie Bears: Robo Rumble. After the success of "Boonie Bears: Homeward Journey", the company began production on the great international Box Office success "Boonie Bears to the Rescue", in which Rick helped doctor the final English script and provided vocals for two tracks on the Original Soundtrack, "Lola's Eyes" and "Boonie Bears Samba".

Overall, Rick helped with the production and character voices of over 600 episodes of Fantawild's biggest shows, such as "Pondemonium", "Brainy Bubbly Bug Buddies", and "Tales from the Salted Egg Temple". After Production of "Boonie Bears: A Mystical Winter" on which Rick was also the musical director, he parted ways with Fantawild Animation in July 2015.

In 2018 Rick voiced SARGE on the virtual reality AAA game "Reboant: Endless Dawn" for the Oculus Rift and Steam. Rick consulted with Dark Lord games on the story and character development. However, by the game's release in 2018, half of the storyline and two of the characters were cut to save on production costs, in order to put more money towards marketing. The game had incredible art design and a solid budget but failed to meet the demands of gamers, who felt the game was too short for the cost.

Rick also appeared on PlayStation 4's "Genesis" (a multiplayer online battle arena game) as five brutal characters. The first was the game's starter character, Apollo (God of the sun), Hades (Lord of the underworld), Jones (Mutant squid pirate), Minotaurus (the beast of darkness and bloodthirst), and Poseidon (the powerful and unforgiving God of the sea).

Rick Jay Glen left China in 2019, to come back to his home state of California where he settled and is continuing his career.

Filmography

Film

Television

Short films

Video Games

Podcasts

Music
Rick was the front-man of progressive metal band, Umbra. The group was formed in late 1995 under the name 813 by Sean Mallet and David Tracey. Rick joined the group in late 1996, they later officially named themselves "Umbra" in 1997. The group dispersed in 2006 after a 9-year run. They recorded one album entitled "Dark Corners of Memory" in 2004.

Discography

External links
Rick Jay Glen on imdb.com
Rick Jay Glen.com

1981 births
Living people
American male voice actors
Male actors from the San Francisco Bay Area
People from Concord, California
21st-century American male actors
Actors from Vallejo, California